Aldo Moscatelli (2 November 1939 – 15 April 2015) was a Swiss footballer who played for Luzern, Basel, St. Gallen and Brühl St. Gallen during the 1960s and early 70s. He played mainly in the position of striker, but also very often as midfielder.

Football career
Moscatelli played his youth football by local club FC Luzern. He made his Nationalliga A debut for Luzern during the 1960–61 season. The then aspiring FC Basel soon became aware of him and the transfer was complete before their 1964–65 season. Moscatelli played his league debut for his new club on 26 August 1964 in the away game against Biel-Bienne. He  scored his first goal for the club during that same game. It was the last goal of the game, but it was not enough to prevent the 2–3 defeat.

In the 1966–67 Nationalliga A season Basel won the championship under player-manager Helmut Benthaus. Basel finished the championship one point clear of FC Zürich who finished in second position. Basel won 16 of the 26 games, drawing eight, losing twice, and they scored 60 goals conceding just 20. During that season Moscatelli played 17 league matches, scoring three goals.

In that season Basel won the double. In the Cup final on 15 May 1967 Basel's opponents were Lausanne-Sports. In the former Wankdorf Stadium, Basel took an early lead through a goal by Helmut Hauser. The equaliser happened two minutes after the half-time break, Josef Kiefer unluckily deflected a free kick from Lausanne's Richard Dürr into his own goal. Hauser scored the decisive goal via penalty. But the game went down in football history due to the sit-down strike that followed this goal. After 88 minutes of play, with the score at 1–1, referee Karl Göppel awarded Basel a controversial penalty. André Grobéty had pushed Hauser gently in the back and Hauser let himself drop theatrically. Subsequently, after the 2–1 lead for Basel the Lausanne players refused to resume the game and they sat down demonstratively on the pitch. The referee had to abandon the match. Basel were awarded the cup with a 3–0 forfait.

Between the years 1964 and 1967 Moscatelli played a total of 95 games for Basel scoring a total of 27 goals. 47 of these games were in the Nationalliga A, 12 in the Swiss Cup, 11 were on European level (Cup of the Alps, Inter-Cities Fairs Cup) and 25 were friendly games. He scored 8 goals in the domestic league, three in the Swiss Cup, one in the Cup of the Alps and the other 15 were scored during the test games.

After his time in Basel, Moscatelli played one season for FC Lugano. He moved on again one year later to FC St. Gallen and joined up again with his old team mate and good friend Markus Pfirter. The two of them were in the team that won the Swiss Cup on 26 May 1969 in the Wankdorf Stadium against Bellinzona by two goals to nil.

Private life
Aldo Moscatelli grew up in Luzern and following his move from the Canton of Ticino to St. Gallen he remained in North-East Switzerland. Moscatelli professional qualification was as Banking expert. For more than 30 years he worked as an employee at the headquarters of the St. Gallen Cantonal Bank. His two sons Mario and Rinaldo also played football. Aldo Moscatelli died unexpectedly in St. Gallen on 15 April 2015 at the age of 75.

Honours
Basel
 Swiss League champions: 1966–67
 Swiss Cup winner: 1966–67

St. Gallen
 Swiss Cup winner: 1968–69

References

Sources
 Rotblau: Jahrbuch Saison 2017/2018. Publisher: FC Basel Marketing AG. 
 Die ersten 125 Jahre. Publisher: Josef Zindel im Friedrich Reinhardt Verlag, Basel. 
 Verein "Basler Fussballarchiv" Homepage

FC Luzern players
FC Basel players
FC Lugano players
FC St. Gallen players
SC Brühl players 
Swiss men's footballers
Association football midfielders
Association football forwards
1939 births
2015 deaths